Childianea is a genus of worms belonging to the family Actinoposthiidae.

The species of this genus are found in Australia.

Species:
 Childianea coomerensis Faubel & Cameron, 2001

References

Acoelomorphs